Methylaluminoxane, commonly called MAO, is a mixture of organoaluminium compounds with the approximate formula (Al(CH3)O)n.  It is usually encountered as a solution in (aromatic) solvents, commonly toluene but also xylene, cumene, or mesitylene, Used in large excess, it activates precatalysts for alkene polymerization.

Preparation and structure
MAO is prepared by the incomplete hydrolysis of trimethylaluminium, as indicated by this idealized equation
n Al(CH3)3  +  n H2O  →  (Al(CH3)O)n  +  2n CH4
Diverse mechanisms have been proposed for the formation of MAO. Well defined analogues of MAO can be generated with tert-butyl substituents.

Uses
MAO is well known as catalyst activator for olefin polymerizations by homogeneous catalysis.  In traditional Ziegler–Natta catalysis, supported titanium trichloride is activated by treatment with trimethylaluminium (TMA). TMA only weakly activates homogeneous precatalysts, such as zirconacene dichloride.  In the mid-1970s Kaminsky discovered that metallocene dichlorides can be activated by MAO (see Kaminsky catalyst). The effect was discovered when a small amount of water was found to enhance the  activity in the Ziegler–Natta system.  

MAO serves multiple functions in the activation process. First it alkylates the metal-chloride pre-catalyst species giving Ti/Zr-methyl intermediates.  Second, it abstracts a ligand from the methylated precatalysts, forming an electrophilic, coordinatively unsaturated catalysts that can undergo ethylene insertion. This activated catalyst is an ion pair between a cationic catalyst and an weakly basic MAO-derived anion.   MAO also functions as scavenger for protic impurities.

See also
Aluminoxane

References

Further reading
 

Polymer chemistry
Aluminium compounds
Catalysts